Felt is a non-woven cloth that is produced by matting, condensing, and pressing fibers.

Felt may also refer to:

Places
Felt, Idaho, an unincorporated community in Teton County, Idaho, US
Felt, Oklahoma, a small community in Cimarron County, Oklahoma, US
Cape Felt, on the Bakutis Coast of Marie Byrd Land, Antarctica

Music
Felt (band), an English rock band
Felt (hip hop group), an American underground hip hop duo
Felt: A Tribute to Christina Ricci, first album by Felt
Felt 2: A Tribute to Lisa Bonet, second album by Felt
Felt 3: A Tribute to Rosie Perez, third album by Felt
Felt (Anchor & Braille album), 2009
Felt (Nils Frahm album), 2011
Felt (The Chain Gang of 1974 album), 2017

People
Felt family, a US family of politicians
Richard Felt (1933–2012), college and AFL football defensive back
Dorr Felt (1862–1930), inventor of the Comptometer, an early computing device
Edward P. Felt (1959–2001), a victim of the September 11, 2001 attacks aboard United Airlines Flight 93
Ephraim Porter Felt (1868–1943), American entomologist specialised in Diptera
Harry D. Felt (1902–1992), American aviator in World War II and commander in chief of Pacific Command
Irving Mitchell Felt (1910–1994), American businessman
John H. Felt (1867–1938), architect and founder of J.H. Felt & Company
Louie B. Felt (1850–1928), Church of Jesus Christ of Latter-day Saints (Mormon) personality
Mark Felt (ne William Mark Felt, Sr., 1913–2008), the senior FBI special agent and Watergate scandal informant called "Deep Throat"
Nathaniel H. Felt (1816–1887), politician and The Church of Jesus Christ of Latter-day Saints (Mormon) personality
Reuben William Felt (1903-1949), American politician and farmer
Robert Felt (1953–2002), computer programmer, National Scrabble Championship-winner
Ulrike Felt (born 1957), Austrian social scientist

Other uses
Felt and Tarrant Manufacturing Company, manufacturer of the Comptometer desk calculator
Felt Bicycles, an American bicycle manufacturer
Roofing felt (asphalt felt), felt paper coated with asphalt bitumen for waterproofing roofs
Marker pen, or felt tip pen, a writing instrument
Felt sense, and felt shift, a kind of awareness in Focusing (psychotherapy)
Felt (Re:Zero), a character in the light novel series Re:Zero − Starting Life in Another World

See also
Felts (disambiguation)
Felted, densely packed or tangled hairy or otherwise filamentous material